Víctor García San Inocencio (born February 6, 1958 in Santurce, San Juan, Puerto Rico) is a lawyer and politician from Puerto Rico who served as Minority Leader in the House of Representatives of Puerto Rico for the Puerto Rican Independence Party from 1997 to 2009. García San Inocencio was known for obtaining the most votes between all candidates aspiring for Representative at-large, regardless of political party, usually obtaining 2–4% more than the second best.

References

Minority leaders of the House of Representatives of Puerto Rico
1958 births
Living people